Hundred to One Hundred is a 1995 Iranian film written and directed by Hossein Shahabi.

Starring
 Mohammad Morovvati
 Karim Nobakht
 Shirin Rahimi
 Azar Vakil
 Hamid Aslani

Crew
 producer: Hossein Shahabi
 Production manager: Hashem Sami
 cinematography: Sadegh Samani
 Sound Recorder: Mahdi Moeeni
 Music: Hossein Shahabi
 Production: Baran film house

References

1997 films
Iranian short films
Films directed by Hossein Shahabi